Wielandieae is a tribe of the family Phyllanthaceae. It comprises 10 genera.

References

Phyllanthaceae
Malpighiales tribes